Smilevo is a village in North Macedonia, municipality of Demir Hisar.

It is famous for the Ilinden-Preobrazhenie uprising which started in the village in the morning of August 2, 1903 (see Battle of Smilevo). The decision for the uprising was taken during the Smilevo congress of the Internal Macedonian Revolutionary Organization (IMRO) from May 2 to May 7, 1903.

The village is the native place of Dame Gruev, one of the founders and most prominent leaders of IMRO. Smilevo also has a statue of Dame Gruev on one of its mountain sides. Below this mountainous terrain is the village. The village has one of the largest schools in the Demir Hisar
municipality.

Geography
The village is situated in the southernmost part of Demir Hisar municipality on the foothills of Bigla mountain on 880 m above sea level on an area of 16.4 square kilometres, 1,400 ha of which are forests, 113 ha are pastures and 104 ha are cultivated area.
It is 10 km from the Demir Hisar — Bitola road.

History

The village was the venue of the IMRO's Smilevo Congress of 1903, at which the decision for uprising against the Ottoman rule in Macedonia was taken by the most prominent members of IMRO.

IMRO's revolutionaries rose up on August 2, 1903, which was marked as the beginning of the Ilinden uprising.

Economy
Smilevo people are traditionally masons who have worked on constructing houses and other objects in other villages and cities in North Macedonia, former Yugoslavia and abroad. In addition to this, many villagers are involved in producing charcoal, agriculture, forestry and other businesses in the surrounding cities and abroad.

Demographics
The population of the village is Macedonian. In 1961, the number of inhabitants was 1,158, while in 1994, the number decreased to 384 due to migration of the people to the cities. It historically has been identified as a Mijak village.

Sights

Near the village is one of the most beautiful monasteries in the country dedicated to St. Peter and Paul (Sveti Petar i Pavle). It has been recently renovated.

On the hill above the village, there is a memorial park dedicated to Dame Gruev.

A museum dedicated to the Smilevo congress and the National Liberation Struggle was opened on the 100th anniversary of the Ilinden uprising in 2003.

Famous inhabitants
Dame Gruev, founder of the Internal Macedonian Revolutionary Organisation

References

Villages in Demir Hisar Municipality